The 1959 Chicago Cardinals season was the team's 40th and final season in Chicago. The Cardinals opened the season with a 49–21 home win over the Washington Redskins at Soldier Field, but finished with a record of two wins and ten losses, last place in the Eastern Conference. They tied with the Los Angeles Rams for the worst record in the 12-team league.

Their final home game in Chicago was on November 29, a 31–7 loss to the cross-town rival Bears at Soldier Field. The home games of October 25 and November 22, both losses, were played in Minnesota at Metropolitan Stadium in Bloomington, the future home of the expansion Minnesota Vikings, starting two years later in 1961.

In March 1960, the Chicago Cardinals relocated to St. Louis and became the St. Louis Cardinals, bringing the NFL back to Missouri. They subsequently moved from St. Louis to the Phoenix area in Arizona.

Regular season

Schedule

Standings

References 

1959
Chicago Cardinals
Chicago Card